Buariki is the largest island in the Aranuka atoll of the Gilbert Islands in the Republic of Kiribati. Together with Takaeang the two large islands form the triangle shape of the atoll with Buariki forming the base.

Villages
 Baurua
 Buariki

Air transportation
The humble Aranuka Airport is located about one kilometre north of Buariki village.

See also
Buariki (Tarawa)

References 

Aranuka
Islands of Kiribati